Mother's Little Helpers or Mother's Little Helper may refer to:

 Nickname for the drug Diazepam (Valium)
 Cougars, Inc., developed under the title Mother's Little Helpers, a 2010 indie film
 "Mother's Little Helper", a 1966 Rolling Stones song
 "Mother's Little Helper" (Medium), a Medium episode
 "Mother's Little Helper", a Casualty (series 11) episode

See also
 "Brother's Little Helper", an episode of The Simpsons television series 
 Santa's Little Helper, a fictional dog from The Simpsons